The discography of English pop rock band McFly consists of 24 singles, 25 music videos, six studio albums, three compilation albums, four live albums and one soundtrack.

Albums

Studio albums

As McBusted

Compilation albums

Live albums

Soundtrack albums

Singles

As McFly

As McBusted

Other charted songs

Notes

Video albums

As McBusted

References

Discography
Discographies of British artists
Pop music group discographies
Rock music group discographies